The Kings River is a tributary of the Quinn River, about  long, in northwestern Nevada and south-central Oregon in the United States. It drains a remote arid area of the northwestern Great Basin.

Description
The river rises in northern Humboldt County, Nevada, west of Disaster Peak in The Granites, part of the Trout Creek Mountains, near the Oregon state line. Flowing northwest, it crosses briefly into Harney County, Oregon, then turns sharply south and re-enters Humboldt County for the rest of its course. It flows generally south between the Bilk Creek Mountains on the right (west) and the Montana Mountains, then the Double H Mountains on the left. It joins the Quinn River from the north at Quinn River Lakes. The Quinn River flows southwest from the lake to end in a sink in the Black Rock Desert west of Winnemucca.

See also

 List of rivers of Nevada
 List of rivers of Oregon
 List of rivers of the Great Basin

References

Rivers of Nevada
Rivers of Harney County, Oregon
Rivers of the Great Basin